Arinjaya Chola was a chola ruler of the Chola kingdom. He was the third son of Parantaka I and the younger brother of Gandaraditya Chola, whom he is thought to have succeeded in about 956. Arinjaya Chola was succeeded by his son Sundara Chola(Parantaka II) as Madurantaka Uttama Chola was not old enough to ascend the throne. Arinjaya seems to have ruled for a very short time.

Recent scholarship suggests that Arinjaya was the son of a Chera princess (hence a half-brother to prince Rajaditya). As per the Anbil plates of Sundara Chola, Arinjaya's mother was the daughter of Paluvettaraiyar, therein described as a Kerala prince.

Other names 

Arinjaya is also referred to by the names Arikulakesari, Arikesari, or Arindama. His name is mentioned in some of Gandaraditya's inscriptions as Alvar Arikulakesarideva.

Paucity of information 

There is some confusion regarding whether Arinjaya actually succeeded Gandaraditya. Some historians doubt whether Arinjaya ruled on his own right. There is little epigraphic evidence available to give us any concrete information on Arinjaya's rule.  What we know now is partly speculative and partly informed extrapolations of known facts.

Gandaraditya probably made his younger brother co-regent very early in his rule. It is also very probable that Gandaraditya did not have any heir until very late in his life. As a result, he must have made Arinjaya heir apparent and paved the way for Arinjaya's heirs to the line of succession to the Chola crown.

Personal life 

We can gather a good deal information from the epigraphs left behind by his peers. He was married to a Vaidumba princess of Eastern Chalukyas called Kalyani, who bore him Sundara Chola. Yet another queen was Boothi Aditya Pidari, the daughter of Tennavan Irukkuvel alias Maravan Boothi. She founded the Chandrasekara temple in Tiruchendurai. This Tennavan Irukkuvel alias Boothi has been identified with none other than Boothi Vikramakesari the builder of the Moovar Koil temple.

Death and succession 
Arinjaya died c. 957 in a place called Arrur, which is possibly present-day Tiruvarur. From an inscription found near Melpadi in north Tamil Nadu, we learn that Rajaraja Chola I erected a Siva temple called Arinjisvara as a tomb-shrine in memory of his grandfather Arinjaya who was also known as "Arrur tunjina devan".

Arinjaya was succeeded by his son Parantaka Chola II (Sundara Chola). Two of his wives Viman Kundaviyar and Kodai Pirattiyar seem to have survived him and made gifts to temples in Arinjaya's name during Parantaka II's reign.

Inscription 

Arinjaya figures in some of the inscriptions of his father Parantaka. Here is an excerpt,

Yet another one from a temple in Tiruvorriyur is as follows,

Notes

References 
 Nilakanta Sastri, K. A. (1935). The CōĻas, University of Madras, Madras (Reprinted 1984).
 Nilakanta Sastri, K. A. (1955). A History of South India, OUP, New Delhi (Reprinted 2002).

Chola kings
10th-century Indian monarchs
950s deaths
Year of death uncertain
Year of birth unknown